David MacGibbon may refer to:

 David MacGibbon (1831–1902), Scottish architect.
David MacGibbon (politician) (born 1934), retired Australian senator.